The Badminton men's team event at the 1994 Asian Games was scheduled from 7 to 9 October 1994 at Tsuru Memorial Gymnasium, Hiroshima.

Schedule
All times are Japan Standard Time (UTC+09:00)

Results

Quarterfinals

Semifinals

Final

Non-participating athletes

References
Results

Men's team